Gervais Baudouin (c. 1645 – 1700) was a surgeon born in France who came to New France  about 1677. 

Baudouin's practice in Quebec consisted of being the doctor to the local Ursulines as well as the seminary of Quebec. In 1695, he was appointed surgeon-major of Quebec, a position he held until his death because of an epidemic. He was survived by his wife and eight children. We know that three daughters became nuns and one son, Michel became a Jesuit priest. Another son, Gervais became a surgeon.

External links
Biography at the Dictionary of Canadian Biography Online

1645 births
1700 deaths
People of New France